The 1985 Maryland Terrapins football team represented University of Maryland in the 1985 NCAA Division I-A football season. The Terrapins offense scored 326 points while the defense allowed 192 points. Led by head coach Bobby Ross, the Terrapins appeared in the Cherry Bowl .

Schedule

Roster

Rankings

Game summaries

Penn State

at Michigan

Miami (FL)

vs. Syracuse (Cherry Bowl)

1986 NFL Draft
The following players were selected in the 1986 NFL Draft.

References

Maryland
Maryland Terrapins football seasons
Atlantic Coast Conference football champion seasons
Maryland Terrapins football